Sundew can refer to:

 Sundew (album), a 1991 album by the Paris Angels
 Sundew (dragline)
 
 The plant genus Drosera
 The sundew family Droseraceae
 SunDew, the original name for the computer windowing system NeWS